Lance Levis Clemons (July 6, 1947 – January 22, 2008) was an American left-handed pitcher in Major League Baseball who played for the Kansas City Royals, St. Louis Cardinals and Boston Red Sox.

Clemons was born in Philadelphia, Pennsylvania. He was traded with Jim York from the Royals to the Houston Astros for John Mayberry and minor league infielder Dave Grangaard at the Winter Meetings on December 2, 1971. He never appeared in a regular season game with the Astros who dealt him along with Scipio Spinks to the Cardinals for Jerry Reuss four months later on April 15, 1972. In a three-season career, he posted a 2–1 record with 23 strikeouts and a 6.06 earned run average in 19 games pitched. He died of cancer at age 60.

References

External links

1947 births
2008 deaths
Major League Baseball pitchers
Boston Red Sox players
Kansas City Royals players
St. Louis Cardinals players
Omaha Royals players
Tulsa Oilers (baseball) players
Pawtucket Red Sox players
Baseball players from Philadelphia
Deaths from cancer in Florida
West Chester Golden Rams baseball players
Corning Royals players
Waterloo Hawks (baseball) players
Waterloo Royals players
Florida Instructional League Royals players